Maffeo Giovanni Ducoli (November 7, 1918 – August 28, 2012) was an Italian Prelate of the Roman Catholic Church.

Ducoli was born in San Mauro di Saline, Italy and was ordained a priest of the Diocese of Verona on May 30, 1942. Ducoli was appointed Auxiliary bishop to the Diocese of Verona along with Titular Bishop of Fidenae on April 22, 1967, and ordained bishop on May 14, 1967. On October 7, 1975, he was appointed bishop of the Diocese of Belluno-Feltre from which he retired on February 2, 1996.

External links
Catholic-Hierarchy
Belluno- Feltre Diocese site (Italian)
Verona Diocese Site (Italian)

20th-century Italian Roman Catholic bishops
1918 births
2012 deaths
Commanders Crosses of the Order of Merit of the Federal Republic of Germany